Sadir Uddin Ahmed (1931–27 August 2018) is a Awami League politician and the former Member of Parliament of Mymensingh-21.

Career
Ahmed was elected to parliament from Mymensingh-21 as an Awami League candidate in 1973.

Death
Ahmed died on 27 August 2018.

References

Awami League politicians
1931 births
2018 deaths
1st Jatiya Sangsad members